Moors Valley Country Park, officially Moors Valley Country Park and Forest, is a Country Park jointly managed by Dorset Council and Forestry England situated in Ashley Heath, Dorset on the border with Hampshire, in the south of England.

The park has adventure play equipment, a tree top walkway, a 'Go Ape!' high ropes course, a visitor centre and restaurant. There is also a narrow gauge steam railway (the Moors Valley Railway), a golf course, lakes, cycle hire, waymarked walks and cycle routes. A ranger service provides a wide range of events and an educational programme. A parkrun event takes place every Saturday morning at 9am on the park.

References

External links
Moors Valley Country Park and Forest

Country parks in Dorset